Mitford is an unincorporated community in Fairfield County, South Carolina, United States.  Its altitude is 568 feet (173 m).

References

Unincorporated communities in Fairfield County, South Carolina
Unincorporated communities in South Carolina
Columbia metropolitan area (South Carolina)